João Batista Coelho (born 21 September 1992), mostly known by his stage name Slow J, is a Portuguese rapper, record producer and singer-songwriter.

Discography

Extended plays

Albums

Singles

As lead artist

As featured artist

External links 

 YouTube
 Instagram

References 

Living people
1992 births
Portuguese rappers
21st-century Portuguese male singers
People from Setúbal